Alibeyli  is a village in Erdemli district of Mersin Province, Turkey. It is  situated in the Taurus Mountains where there are spruce forests. The population of the village was 588  as of 2012. The population of Alibeyli is composed of a once-nomadic tribe Bağdili (an Oghuz Turk tribe), which settled in 1800 in its present location. The major economic activity is fruit farming; peaches, apples, and cherries are among the main crops of the village.

References

Villages in Erdemli District